The Working Mechanism for Consultation and Coordination on India–China Border Affairs (WMCC) was set up through an India-China agreement in January 2012 for improved institutionalized information exchange on border related issues. The mechanism was first suggested by Wen Jiabao in 2010. It was finalised at the 15th round of special representative talks in January 2012.

On 16 December 2010, Chinese Premier Wen Jiabao said at the Indian Council of World Affairs,

According to the agreement, the mechanism is led by a "Joint Secretary level official from the Ministry of External Affairs of the Republic of India and a Director General level official from the Ministry of Foreign Affairs of the People's Republic of China and will be composed of diplomatic and military officials". The working mechanism will "not discuss resolution of the Boundary Question or affect the Special Representatives Mechanism".

Rounds 

 6 March 2012
 29–30 November 2012
 23–24 July 2013
 29–30 September 2013
 10 February 2014
 28–30 April 2014
 27 August 2014
 16–17 October 2014
-
17 November 2017
22 March 2018
27 September 2018
29 January 2019
29 July 2019
24 June 2020 (virtual)
10 July 2020
24 July 2020 
20 August 2020 
30 September 2020
18 December 2020
-
25 June 2021

See also 

 India China border agreements
 1988: India-China Joint Working Group on the boundary question
 Confidence building measures
 1993: Border Peace and Tranquility Agreement
 1996: Agreement on Military Confidence Building Measures
 2005: Protocol for the Implementation of Military Confidence Building Measures
 Political measures
 2003: Declaration on Principles for Relations and Comprehensive Cooperation
 2005: Agreement on the Political Parameters and Guiding Principles for the Settlement of the India-China Boundary Question
 2012: Agreement on the Establishment of a Working Mechanism for Consultation and Coordination on India-China Border Affairs
 2013: Border Defence Cooperation Agreement
 2020: 5 point statement

References 

Bibliography

 
 

China–India relations
China–India border